CJK Unified Ideographs 04E00-062FF